The Tofthagen Library and Museum on W. B Ave. in Lakota, North Dakota is a building erected in 1927.  It has also been known as the Lakota City Library.

It includes Prairie School architecture.  It was listed on the National Register of Historic Places in 1991 as Tofthagen Library Museum.

It is named for the library's donor, Amun M. Tofthagen, who was born in Hundorp, Norway in 1858.

References

External links
A.M. Tofthagen Library - Museum - City of Lakota

Libraries on the National Register of Historic Places in North Dakota
Prairie School architecture in North Dakota
Library buildings completed in 1927
Museums in Nelson County, North Dakota
History museums in North Dakota
National Register of Historic Places in Nelson County, North Dakota
1927 establishments in North Dakota